Vasco Miguel Lopes de Matos (born 10 October 1980) is a Portuguese retired professional footballer who played as a winger, currently assistant manager of Casa Pia.

He spent most of his career in his country's second tier, making 272 appearances and scoring 14 goals for six clubs. In Primeira Liga, he played 21 games and scored three times for Vitória de Setúbal and Beira-Mar.

Playing career
Born in Brandoa in Amadora, Lisbon District, Matos began playing at C.F. Estrela da Amadora at the age of eight before choosing Sporting CP over S.L. Benfica four years later. He never made a first-team appearance for the Lions, instead playing for farm team S.C. Lourinhanense and the reserve team in the third division.

In 2001, Matos was loaned to S.C. Campomaiorense of the second tier for his first professional experience, and the club's last season at that level. He left for Vitória F.C. where he would make his Primeira Liga debut in 2002–03, albeit in a relegation. The following campaign he played in a cash-strapped F.C. Felgueiras team where he went for five months without pay.

After representing S.C. Olhanense and S.C. Beira-Mar – the latter being relegated from the top-flight in 2006–07 – Matos had his only experience abroad in February 2008, with FC Rapid București in Romania's Liga I. That 15 August, he returned to his country's division two with Portimonense S.C. on a two-year deal.

Matos played four seasons with C.D. Aves again in the second tier, and one each at third-division Sport Benfica e Castelo Branco and U.D. Vilafranquense of the Lisbon Football Association's first district league before retiring in 2016.

Coaching career
Matos assisted Filipe Coelho at Vilafranquense, and became manager of the third-tier side in December 2017 when the latter moved abroad. He debuted on 10 December with a 2–0 away win against GS Loures, and finished the season as runners-up to C.D. Mafra before elimination in the play-off semi-finals by S.C. Farense (4–1 aggregate).

On 6 March 2019, Matos was replaced in his job by Filipe Moreira. Three months later, he was appointed at nearby F.C. Alverca in the same league. On 17 October, he led them to a 2–0 home victory over Sporting in the third round of the Taça de Portugal, only the second time that the opposition had been eliminated by a third-division club. He left by mutual consent on 27 December.

Matos returned to the game on 5 July 2020 at Casa Pia AC, who had been kept in division two on a court decision. He left his post still during pre-season, but remained with the team as an assistant manager.

References

External links

1980 births
Living people
People from Amadora
Sportspeople from Lisbon District
Portuguese footballers
Association football wingers
Primeira Liga players
Liga Portugal 2 players
Segunda Divisão players
Sporting CP B players
S.C. Campomaiorense players
Vitória F.C. players
F.C. Felgueiras players
S.C. Olhanense players
S.C. Beira-Mar players
Portimonense S.C. players
C.D. Aves players
Sport Benfica e Castelo Branco players
U.D. Vilafranquense players
Liga I players
FC Rapid București players
Portugal youth international footballers
Portuguese expatriate footballers
Expatriate footballers in Romania
Portuguese expatriate sportspeople in Romania
Portuguese football managers